Finley Township is one of five townships in Scott County, Indiana. As of the 2010 census, its population was 1,469 and it contained 630 housing units.

Geography

Unincorporated towns
 Leota

References

External links
 Indiana Township Association
 United Township Association of Indiana

Townships in Scott County, Indiana
Townships in Indiana